Kozyatağı is a neighbourhood of Kadıköy one of the districts of Istanbul. It is to the East of Göztepe west of Bostancı south of Ataşehir and north of the coastal neighbourhoods.

Transport
The M4 and the planned M8 metro lines run through Kozyatağı, along with many bus lines and minibuses. It is also easily accessible by the D-100 highway. Kozyatağı is landlocked, but ferries in Kadıköy and Bostancı can be reached easily.

Surroundings
The area consists of mainly residential apartments along with many commercial towers and plazas. High-rise buildings are not common in the Anatolian side except Kozyatağı, Ataşehir and a few more areas. There are also many parks and green areas along with a shopping mall.

Neighbourhoods of Kadıköy